Katie Marie Quilton (born 30 November 1983 in Nuneaton, Warwickshire) is an English television presenter and journalist. She is best known for presenting a number of Channel 4 television series, including Food Unwrapped since 2012.

Career
While at the University of Bristol, she undertook a student equivalent of Morgan Spurlock's Super Size Me, she ate kebabs for one week: breakfast, lunch and dinner. The stunt was picked-up by a national paper. Quilton began her career in television while a student, and worked for ITV and the BBC. She went on to work as a broadcast journalist in Somerset for the BBC, spending a lot of her time with farmers, and reporting mostly on food.

Quilton was one of Channel 4's commissioning editors, a position she held 2010–14. She operated the World Wide Web editorial for some of the channel's biggest shows. She manages factual multi-platform commissions including The Food Hospital and Foxes Live. She won the BAFTA for Digital Creativity and the Digital Emmy award in 2014.

She resigned as a commissioning editor in 2014 to focus full-time on Food Unwrapped. In 2014, Quilton appeared with Food Unwrapped co-presenter Jimmy Doherty in The World's Best Diet, a one-off show for Channel 4.

In 2015, she presented Superfoods: The Real Story, a four-part series for Channel 4. The show returned for a second series of six episodes in 2016. She presented The Shopper's Guide to Saving Money, with David Fishwick, for four episodes in 2015. Since January 2016, she presented Tricks of the Restaurant Trade alongside Simon Rimmer. The programming returned for a second series in November 2016. For the third series, she was replaced by Sophie Morgan. In 2016, she co-presented Be Your Doctor on Channel 4, alongside Tamal Ray. She took part in a special edition of Christmas University Challenge in December 2016, as part of the University of Bristol alumni team.

2017 and in 2019, she presented Channel 4's Animal Rescue Live: Supervet Special series with Noel Fitzpatrick and Steve Jones.

Personal life

Quilton grew up in Bury St Edmunds, Suffolk, the youngest of four children. She attended Thurston Community College.

In April 2016, Quilton ran the London Marathon for Papworth Hospital in memory of her father, Kevin Quilton. 

She married James Lance in 2016. On the Food Unwrapped Christmas special in December 2017, she announced that she was expecting her first child. She gave birth to their son in May 2018. As presenter in the documentary Breastfeeding Uncovered, Quilton revealed she was harassed while nursing in public.

Filmography
Television

References

External links
Official Twitter

1983 births
Living people
Channel 4 presenters
English television editors
English television presenters
Women television editors
Mass media people from Bury St Edmunds